Ust-Koyva is a rural locality (a settlement) in Gornozavodsky District, Perm Krai, Russia. The population was 18 as of 2010. There are 9 streets.

Geography 
Ust-Koyva is located 28 km southwest of Gornozavodsk (the district's administrative centre) by road. Kusye-Alexandrovsky is the nearest rural locality.

References 

Rural localities in Gornozavodsky District